The following lists events in the year 2016 in Armenia.

Incumbents
 President: Serzh Sargsyan
 Prime Minister: Hovik Abrahamyan (until 13 September), Karen Karapetyan (starting 13 September) 
 Speaker: Galust Sahakyan

Events

April
 1–5 April - 2016 Nagorno-Karabakh conflict

July
 17 July - At least one person is reportedly killed and others are taken hostage after an armed group seized control of a police building in Yerevan, the capital of Armenia. The gunmen demanded the release of jailed opposition figure, Jirair Sefilian, according to the National Security Service.
 31 July - The hostage crisis comes to an end in Yerevan after the remaining gunmen laid down their arms in a police station surrender to police.

August
 5–21 August - 33 athletes from Armenia competed at the 2016 Summer Olympics in Rio de Janeiro, Brazil.

September
 21 September - Armenia celebrates its 25th anniversary of its independence with a military parade on the Republic Square in the center of Yerevan.

References

 
2010s in Armenia
Years of the 21st century in Armenia
Armenia
Armenia
Armenia